Yeh Adam is a 1986 Pakistani-Punjabi action-political film directed by Irshad Sajid written by Nasir Adeeb and produced by Bashir Ahmad Butt.

Cast 
 Sultan Rahi - (hasoo)
 Aasia - (sheedna)
 Aliya Begum - (sabra)
 Masood Akhtar - (nasir)
 Nimmi - (razia)
 Afzal Khan - (ustad seeda)
 Zummard - (anju bhai)
 Mehboob Alam - (chaudhary)
 Manuwar Saeed - (thanedaar)
 Munir Zarif - (jimmi)
 Afzaal Ahmad - (dewana)
 Allauddin - (baba jee)
 Mustafa Qureshi - (billa pehlwan)
 Adeeb (police officer)
 Rehan - (justice)
 Saqi- (justice2)

Songs (album) 
For all film songs, music composer was Nazir Ali & M. Javed and film song lyrics were written by Waris Ludhyanvi.

 Noor Jehan
 Mehnaz
 Rubina Badar
 Masood Rana
 Shaukat Ali
 Alam Lohar

References

External links
 

1980s crime action films
Pakistani crime action films
1986 films
Punjabi-language Pakistani films